The  is a DC electric multiple unit (EMU) train operated by West Japan Railway Company (JR-West) for use on suburban services in the Hiroshima area of Japan since 14 March 2015, with plans for additional sets in the Kinki Region beginning in 2019.

Design
The trains have unpainted stainless steel bodies, with an exterior livery featuring red highlights. Each motored car has one motored bogie. The first batch of trains will be branded "Red Wing", with logos applied to the body sides and to the prominent anti-fall plates on the front ends, which inspired the name.

Sets being ordered for 2022 will feature the colour pink which is associated with cherry blossoms as well as the softer climate experienced along the lines in which these trainsets will be running.

Operations
The trains will also displace 115 series EMUs on the Kure Line and Kabe Line, with the entire fleet of 276 vehicles (106 sets) scheduled to be delivered by the end of fiscal 2018. Additional sets are being ordered for the San'yō Main Line in Okayama as of 2022.

Formations
The 227 series fleet on order consists of 42 two-car and 64 three-car sets, allowing formations of up to eight cars to be formed in service.

Hiroshima Area sets

3-car sets
The three-car sets are numbered A01 onward, and are formed as shown below with all three cars motored (one motored bogie per car).

 The seating capacity figures above include 12 flip-down seats in the end cars and 16 in the intermediate cars.
 The KuMoHa 227 car is fitted with a WPS28E single-arm pantograph.
 The KuMoHa 226 car has a universal access toilet.

2-car sets

The two-car sets are numbered S01 onward, and are formed as shown below with both cars motored (one motored bogie per car).

 The seating capacity figures above include 12 flip-down seats in each car.
 The KuMoHa 227 car is fitted with a WPS28E single-arm pantograph.
 The KuMoHa 226 car has a universal access toilet.

Wakayama Area sets

 The seating capacity figures above include longitudinal seats in each car.
 The KuMoHa 227 car is fitted with a WPS28E single-arm pantograph.
 The SD sets are equipped with a second de-icing pantograph. 
 The KuMoHa 226 car has a universal access toilet.

Interior
The passenger saloons use LED lighting, and the trains are equipped with universal access toilets and wheelchair spaces. In addition, they are also equipped with LED passenger information displays.

227-0 series 
Passenger accommodation consists of transverse seating with flip-over seat backs, and longitudinal bench seating at the ends of cars. Flip-down seats are also provided next to the doorways.

227-1000 series 
Passenger accommodation consists of longitudinal bench seating throughout. As the 227-1000 series trains support  operation, doorways are equipped with ticket machines.

History
The first three-car set, numbered A03, was delivered to Hiroshima Depot in September 2014 from the Kawasaki Heavy Industries Rolling Stock Company factory in Kobe. Sets A01 and A02 were delivered to Hiroshima Depot from Kinki Sharyo in October 2014. The first two car set, numbered S01, was delivered from Kawasaki Heavy Industries in January 2015 together with three-car set A06.

In March 2018, JR West announced, that starting in Spring 2019, it planned to introduce a new version of 227 series trains to Sakurai and Wakayama Lines, as well as part of Kisei Main Line. The planned 56-car fleet (28 sets of 2-car units) would displace all 105 series and 117 series trains on the two lines by Spring 2020. Once the order is complete, the trains would have smart card readers on board, expanding ICOCA acceptance to all JR West service in Nara prefecture and on Wakayama Line.

In January 2022, it was announced that the 227-0 series would undergo a trial for platform-side cameras. The cameras would be activated on the right side of the train relative to the direction of driving.

JR West announced plans to build 101 new cars in 2-car and 3-car formations in May 2022. The trainsets are set to be used on rail lines serving Okayama and Bingo such as the San'yō Line and are scheduled for a 2023 entry into service. Designated as 227-500 series, the first three sets were delivered from Kinki Sharyo in February 2023. The series was given the brand name  owing to a naming contest run by JR West. 13 two-car sets and 25 three-car sets will be manufactured in total.

Build details

227-0 series

3-car sets

2-car sets

227-1000 series

References

External links

 JR-West press release (19 June 2014) 
 JR West press release (Okayama sets) (in Japanese)

Electric multiple units of Japan
West Japan Railway Company
Train-related introductions in 2015
Kawasaki multiple units
Kinki Sharyo multiple units
1500 V DC multiple units of Japan